Robert Samuel "Bob" Belcher Jr. is the main protagonist of the adult-animated sitcom Bob's Burgers created by Loren Bouchard for FOX. He is the often stressed, anxious patriarch of the Belcher family and owner of his restaurant Bob's Burgers. He is known for being mild-mannered, pessimistic, and being a terrible businessman, often having financial struggles in keeping the restaurant running and paying rent. He has a rivalry with the Italian restaurant owner across the street, Jimmy Pesto, and quarrels with local health inspector Hugo. Bob is a third-generation restaurant owner, and by nature, loves his business and has big ideas for his different burgers (in particular, having a new "burger of the day" for multiple years). He has a strong love for his family, including his wife Linda, and his children Louise, Gene, and Tina Belcher.

Background 
In 1967, Robert Belcher Sr. (nicknamed "Big Bob") and Lily Belcher  had Bob. Bob didn't have a good childhood, losing his mother at age 13, having to work at his father's restaurant "Big Bob's Diner", and envying children that had real toys and playtime. On Christmas of 1984, Bob was kicked out of the duplex after serving "jokey burger specials" and refusing to officially partner with Big Bob.

On September 3, 1998, Bob marries Linda Belcher (née Genarro) at City Hall. At some point, they buy the restaurant and have Tina, followed by Gene, and Louise two years later. The series starts when Louise is nine, and the restaurant is having its grand re-re-re opening after a utility pole falls into the front of the building.

Reception 
Bob has been a generally well-received character, but not to a high degree. Following its release, multiple critics have given their opinions on Bob in The Bob's Burgers Movie. Hollywood in Toto stated that Bob is pushed to the sidelines too much, and not given enough screentime. Scott Tobias of The Guardian liked Bob's on-screen chemistry with Linda, which he believes is well established at the beginning of the film. Glenn Kenny of The New York Times appreciated the "relatively grounded in reality" plot of Bob trying to pay back the bank, as he is a provider for his family and it makes thematic sense.

In her review of the entire franchise, Rebecca Shaw of The Sydney Morning Herald goes into detail about how Bob is not working towards a greater goal, or hoping for wealth no matter how hard he tries. He is simply trying to provide for his family and make sure his kids will have better opportunities as adults. In Skip Anderson's We Got This Covered review of season two, episode seven ("Moody Foodie"), he applauds H. Jon Benjamin's voice work on the character, stating "[he] did a fantastic job portraying a man descending into madness." Lenny Burnham of Hardwood and Hollywood 's review on season nine, episode seventeen ("What About Blob?") comments on the "fantastic scene" where Linda and Teddy insult Bob. In Chris Cabin's review of season two, he remarks that Bob's straight-man role, small-business-owner status, and melancholy relationship with his wife provides an original outlook.

Notes

References 

Bob's Burgers
Television characters introduced in 2011
Male characters in animated series
Fictional chefs
20th Television Animation characters
Fictional businesspeople